Chlorolydella is a genus of bristle flies in the family Tachinidae. There are about 10 described species in Chlorolydella.

Species
These 10 species belong to the genus Chlorolydella:
 Chlorolydella bequaerti (Curran, 1940) c
 Chlorolydella caffrariae Townsend, 1933 c g
 Chlorolydella glauca (Karsch, 1886) c g
 Chlorolydella pallidipes (Curran, 1927) c g
 Chlorolydella pulchricornis (Villeneuve, 1938) c g
 Chlorolydella schistacea Mesnil, 1955 c g
 Chlorolydella trochanterata (Villeneuve, 1934) c g
 Chlorolydella varipes Mesnil, 1970 c g
 Chlorolydella venusta (Curran, 1928) c
 Chlorolydella violacea (Curran, 1927) c g
Data sources: i = ITIS, c = Catalogue of Life, g = GBIF, b = Bugguide.net

References

Further reading

External links

 
 

Tachinidae